Hardau is a quarter in the district 6 of Winterthur.

It was formerly a part of Wülflingen municipality, which was incorporated into Winterthur in 1922.

Winterthur